Wonck Airport  was a public use airport located near Bassenge, Liège, Wallonia, Belgium. The airport is not in use anymore.

See also
List of airports in Belgium

References

External links 
 Airport record for Wonck Airport at Landings.com

Airports in Liège Province
Bassenge